is a railway station in Kokuraminami-ku, Kitakyushu, Japan, operated by Kyushu Railway Company (JR Kyushu). It is the closest station for New Kitakyushu Airport.

Lines
Kusami Station is served by the Nippō Main Line.

Adjacent stations

See also
 List of railway stations in Japan

External links

  

Railway stations in Fukuoka Prefecture
Buildings and structures in Kitakyushu
Railway stations in Japan opened in 1952